Garfield High School may refer to:

Garfield High School (Akron, Ohio)
Garfield High School (New Jersey), Garfield, Bergen County, New Jersey
Garfield High School (California), in East Los Angeles, California
James A. Garfield High School (Garrettsville, Ohio)
Garfield High School (Seattle), Washington

See also
Garfield Heights High School, Garfield Heights, Ohio
Gar-Field Senior High School, Dale City, Virginia